Frankie and Johnny may refer to:

Films
Frankie and Johnny (1936 film), 1936 film co-starring Lilyan Tashman
Frankie and Johnny (1966 film), a film starring Elvis Presley
Frankie and Johnny (1991 film), a 1991 film based on Terrence McNally's play
Frankie and Johnny Are Married, a 2003 comedy film about a troubled production of Terrence McNally's play

Other
The story is discussed in:
"Frankie and Johnny" (song), an American popular song
Frankie and Johnny (ballet), a 1920s ballet choreographed by Ruth Page
Frankie and Johnny (soundtrack), soundtrack for the Elvis Presley film
Frankie and Johnny (1928 play), a 1928 play by Jack Kirkland
Frankie and Johnny (1930 play), a 1930 play by John Huston
Frankie and Johnny in the Clair de Lune, a 1987 play by Terrence McNally